Jefferson Elementary School may refer to;

United States schools by state
 Jefferson Elementary School (Little Rock, Arkansas), in Cammack Village, Arkansas
 Jefferson Elementary School (Corona, California), part of Corona-Norco Unified School District
 Jefferson Elementary School (Redondo Beach, California)
 Jefferson Elementary School (Santa Ana, California)
Jefferson Elementary School (Vandalia, Illinois)
 Jefferson Elementary School (Washington, Indiana)
 Jefferson Elementary School (Creston, Iowa)
 Jefferson Elementary School (Muscatine, Iowa)
 Jefferson Elementary School (Winona, Minnesota)
 Jefferson Elementary School (Westfield, New Jersey)
 Jefferson Elementary School (Pottstown, Pennsylvania)
 Jefferson Elementary School (Spokane, Washington)
 Jefferson Elementary School (Tacoma, Washington), part of Tacoma Public Schools

See also
List of schools named after Thomas Jefferson